Gourmandises (English: Delicacies) is the debut studio album by French recording artist Alizée, released worldwide on 13 March 2001 by Polydor Records. It was certified double platinum by the Syndicat National de l'Édition Phonographique (SNEP) in December 2001, denoting sales of over a million copies in Europe.

Four singles were released from the album, including global top-five hits "Moi... Lolita", "L'Alizé" and "Gourmandises". To promote Gourmandises and her following album, Alizée embarked on the En Concert Tour in 2003 with her next successful studio album Mes courants electriques. Critics and scholars have noted the album's influence on popular music, particularly the way it helped reintroduce electronic music to the pop scene. The production style, blending acoustic and electronic instruments, is similar to English producer William Orbit's work on Madonna's 1998 album, Ray of Light.

Lauded by critics as a masterpiece in the contemporary French Pop repertoire, the album was acclaimed on its release with reviewers commending the singer's vocals and choice of musical direction.

The singer and the album were honored by the highest accolade given by SACEM, the Prix Vincent Scotto in 2002. The NRJ Music Awards, M6 and many others media and music institutions nominated the singer, including her nomination to the Victoires de la Musique in the "Revelation Album of the Year" category.

Background and composition
Recording for the debut album started in mid-2000. The album included elements of world music, pop, chanson and dance. However, the album also incorporated strong elements of electronic music. Additionally, several genres and subgenres including techno, trip hop, drum and bass, ambient, rock and classical music influenced the album.

Development
After Alizée's participation in the Graines de star show where she met Laurent Boutonnat and veteran French pop diva Mylène Farmer, she was invited to record a single with their support as a songwriting team. Her first two albums, which she worked on alongside Boutonnat and Farmer, had a lovely yet powerful voice that heavily included techno and pop music.

In July 2000 Alizée released single "Moi... Lolita", and after achieving high sales in France, released her second single "L'Alizé" in December 2000. The single reached number one in France and topped charts in several other countries across the world, however did not chart in the United States. Following the release of Gourmandises, Alizée was named Europop Queen by NRJ Radio. Three months later, third single "Parler tout bas" also gained number one on French radio stations. The actual album Gourmandises was released in May 2001, charting strongly worldwide.

Alizée received public praise on television channel M6 and NRJ Radio. Among other nominations and awards, she was nominated for the Victoires de la Musique. The following year Alizée received the World Music Award from the IFPI for top sales. In 2003 Alizée received an award from SACEM the most prestigious recognition given for the institution the Prix Vincent Sotto.

Singles
"Moi... Lolita" was the first track from the album and was released as her debut single on 4 July 2000. It was popular in various countries such as, France, Spain, Belgium, Georgia, Austria, the Netherlands, Lebanon, Ukraine, Turkey, Azerbaijan, Russia, Greece, Italy, Germany, Poland, Denmark, United Kingdom. "L'Alizé" was the second single from the album and was released in December 2000. It featured the song "L'alizé" as well as an instrumental version of the same track. Two limited editions were also released, which featured four remixes. The song became a hit particularly in France where it reached number one for two weeks. "Parler tout bas" was the third single by Alizée released in April 2001. It featured an instrumental rendition of the song in addition to Alizée's solo rendering.

Critical reception

Gourmandises received positive reviews from contemporary critics upon its release. In 2013, following speculation about Alizée's fifth album, 5, critics referred to Gourmandises as a "pop masterpiece of the contemporary music", calling it a "classic" of the 2000s decade and of the new millennium.

Legacy
Gourmandises gained Alizée worldwide fame while the album sold almost 1,000,000 copies in Europe. In early 2001, she won the NRJ Music Awards for Francophone Revelation. In late 2000 she won an M6 Award. The album was also nominated in a same category on Victoires de la Musique.

The album's debut single "Moi... Lolita" generated a lot of international attention, peaking 2nd place on French charts. The single is listed as the 33rd best selling single in the history of France. Also, single called "L'Alizé" hit high in the charts, which stayed on top of the French charts for several weeks, peaking 1st position.

Newspaper Le Figaro naming Mylène Farmer as the French artist who had made the most revenue from copyright in 2001, earning 10.4 million euros as a singer, songwriter, composer and producer of Alizée.

Gourmandises was certified platinum in Europe, gold in Belgium and platinum in Switzerland.

Track listing

Personnel
Credits adapted from Gourmandises liner notes.

Alizée: Vocals, backing vocals (all songs)
Laurent Boutonnat: keyboards, programming
Bernard Paganotti: bass guitar
Slim Pezin: guitar
Matthieu Rabaté: drums
Ann Calvert: chorus (J.B.G and Veni, vedi, vici)
Emeline Chetaud: assistant to Laurent Boutonnat
Engineered by Jérôme Devoise & Didier Lozahic

Assistant engineers: Stéphane Briand & Denis Caribaux
Mixed by Didier Lozahic ("Lui ou toi" to "À quoi rêve une jeune fille")
Mixed by Bertrand Châtenet ("Moi... Lolita")
Mastered by Bruno Gruel & André Perriat at Top Master, Paris
Executive producer: Paul Van Parys for Requiem Publishing
L.B.: photography
Henry Neu for Com'N.B: cover design

Charts and sales
The album was considered a great commercial success.
In its first week of release, the album debuted at tenth place on the French Top 100 Albums Chart. Reaching number 1 in the ninth week and remaining there for the entire first month of its release, the album was certified platinum. In Europe, the album single Moi... Lolita gained popularity with the album reaching the top 25 of many European charts.
After being on the French charts throughout the year, the album hit gold in Belgium and platinum in Europe. In 2002 the album was still listed on the top charts and was then certified double platinum in France.

Weekly charts

Certifications and sales

Release history

See also 
 List of best-selling albums in France

References

External links
Alizée Discogs discography

2000 debut albums
Alizée albums
Polydor Records albums